Cyrillona (fl. 4th century AD) (alternative spelling: Qurilona, a diminutive from Kyrillos) was an early Syriac poet.
He was the younger contemporary of Ephrem the Syrian. Gustav Bickell has referred to him as the most important Syriac poet after Ephrem. 
He was a contemporary of Balai of Qenneshrin.

It is speculated that he might have been a nephew of Ephrem the Syrian.

Only five of Cyrillona's poems survive, each examined and explained by Griffin, but "On the Grain of Wheat" is of doubtful authenticity. His poem On Zaccheus, is about the invasion of Syria by Huns, is preserved on the manuscript BL Add. 14,591 kept at the British Library.

Bibliography
– mons. Costantino Vona (a cura di), I carmi di Cirillona. Studio introduttivo - traduzione - commento, Roma Parigi Tournai New York,  Desclée & C.  editori pontifici.
- Carl Griffin, Cyrillona. A Critical Study and Commentary, Piscataway (NJ), Gorgias, 2016.
- Calr Griffin (ed.),The Works of Cyrillona, Piscataway (NJ), Gorgias, 2016.

References

Sources

External links 

Syriac writers
Syrian poets
4th-century poets